Sheikh Mohammed bin Jassim bin Mohammed Al Thani (17 January 1881 – 8 April 1971) was the son of Sheikh Jassim bin Mohammed Al Thani. Sheikh Mohammed had a total of 18 siblings, with him being the seventh of his father's sons.

Early life 

Sheikh Mohammed bin Jassim Mohammed Al Thani was born in 1881, in Doha, the capital city and state of Qatar. He reigned for 10 months and Abdicated in favour of his Brother Shiekh Abdullah bin Qassim. He was appointed by his brothers to become Prince of the city of Doha, until his death in 1971. Her highness Shiekha Moza bint Nasser Al Misnad renovated his house in what is now called Doha Land, Shiekh Mohammed bin Jassim's house is now open to the public.

Children
Sheikh Mohammed bin Jassim Al Thani's wife was Sheikha Aisha bint Ahmed Al Thani, his first cousin. She was the mother of Sheikh Jassim, Sheikh Abdullah and Sheikh Ahmed, Sheikh Mohammed had a total of 27 children 12 sons and 15 daughters., it is known that his last wife who he loved dearly was known to be head chief of all his living wives back then, Her Highness, The Late Sheikha Safiya Al-Kaabi.

''Note that this list is in descending order according to their age, from the eldest son to the youngest. Same is true with the daughters.

Sheikh Jassim bin Mohammed bin Jassim Bin Mohammed Al Thani
Sheikh Ahmed bin Mohammed bin Jassim Bin Mohammed Al Thani
Sheikh Abdullah bin Mohammed bin Jassim Bin Mohammed Al Thani
Sheikh Thamir bin Mohammed bin Jassim Al Thani
Sheikh Ghanim bin Mohammed Al Thani
Sheikh Thani bin Mohammed Al Thani
Sheikh Abdulrahman bin Mohammed Al Thani
Sheikh Khalid bin Mohammed Al Thani
Sheikh Khalifa bin Mohammed Al Thani
Sheikh Mansoor bin Mohammed Al Thani
Sheikh Falih bin Mohammed Al Thani
Sheikh Jabor bin Mohammed Al Thani
Sheikha Fatima bint Mohammed Al Thani, married to Sheikh Hassan bin Abdullah bin Jassim Al Thani, her first cousin
Sheikha Sarah bint Mohammed Al Thani, married to Sheikh Hamad bin Abdullah bin Jassim Al Thani, her first cousin
Sheikha Loulwa bint Mohammed Al Thani, married to Sheikh Ghanim bin Abdulrahman bin Jassim Al Thani, her first cousin
Sheikha Hessa bint Mohammed Al Thani, married to Sheikh Khailid bin Abdulrahman bin Jassim Al Thani, her first cousin
Sheikha Sheikha bint Mohammed Al Thani, married to Sheikh Saud bin Thani bin Jassim Al Thani, her first cousin
Sheikha Noura bint Mohammed Al Thani, married to Sheikh Ahmed bin Thani bin Jassim Al Thani, her first cousin
Sheikha Sharifa bint Mohammed Al Thani,
Sheikha Maryam bint Mohammed Al Thani,
Sheikha Moza bint Mohammed Al Thani,
Sheikha Sara bint Mohammed Al Thani,
Sheikha Rowda bint Mohammed Al Thani,
Sheikha Hamda bint Mohammed Al Thani,
Sheikha Alya bint Mohammed Al Thani,
Sheikha Seeda bint Mohammed Al Thani,

 the exact date of his death is still unknown

References

1881 births
1971 deaths
Mohammed bin Jassim Al Thani
Mohammed bin Jassim Al Thani
Mayors of places in Qatar
20th-century Arabs
Sons of monarchs